In optics, orange has a wavelength between approximately 585 and 620 nm and a hue of 30° in HSV color space. In the RGB color space it is a secondary color numerically halfway between gamma-compressed red and yellow, as can be seen in the RGB color wheel. The complementary color of orange is  azure. Orange pigments are largely in the ochre or cadmium families, and absorb mostly blue light.

Varieties of the color orange may differ in hue, chroma (also called saturation, intensity, or colorfulness) or lightness (or value, tone, or brightness), or in two or three of these qualities. Variations in value are also called tints and shades, a tint being an orange or other hue mixed with white, a shade being mixed with black.  A large selection of these various colors is shown below.

Orange (color wheel)

The color known as color wheel orange is the tone of orange that is a pure chroma on the HSV color wheel, the expression of which is known as the RGB color wheel, exactly halfway between red and yellow.  The complementary color of orange is azure.

Computer web color oranges

Orange (web color)

The web color called orange is defined in CSS as the hex triplet FFA500.

Dark orange (web color)

There is a web color called dark orange.

Aerospace and safety

Safety orange

Safety orange (also known as blaze orange, and a number of other names) was defined in ANSI standard Z535.1–1998 and is commonly used in a wide variety of contexts to warn of hazards, including: high-viz clothing, road cones, and as the background color in safety warning notices.

International orange (Aerospace)

A shade of orange known as International orange is used in the aerospace industry to set objects apart from their surroundings, similar to Safety orange, but deeper and with a more reddish tone. It was the color used for the Space Shuttle pressure suits.

International orange (Golden Gate Bridge)

The tone of international orange used to paint the Golden Gate Bridge in San Francisco, California is slightly lighter than the standard International orange used by military contractors and in engineering (shown below), thus increasing its visibility to ships. The 25 de Abril Bridge in Lisbon, Portugal also uses this color.

Additional definitions of orange

Orange (Pantone)

The color called  orange in Pantone is taken from the "Pantone Textile Paper eXtended (TPX)" color list, color #021 TPX—Orange.

Orange (Crayola)

Orange was one of the original colors formulated by Crayola in 1903.

Other variations of orange

Papaya whip

The web color papaya whip is a pale tint of orange. It is a representation of the color that would result if mashed papayas were blended with vanilla ice cream, whipped cream, or yogurt.

Peach

The first recorded use of peach as a color name in English was in 1588.

Light orange

A light orange color was formulated for Crayola colored pencils.

Apricot

Apricot has been in use as a color name since 1851.

Melon

The color melon is a representation of the color of the interior flesh of a cantaloupe, the most commonly consumed melon.

The first recorded use of melon as a color name in English was in 1892.

In 1958, melon was formulated as one of the Crayola colors.

Atomic tangerine

Atomic tangerine was formulated by Crayola in 1990.

(Atomic tangerine is supposed to be a fluorescent color, but there is no mechanism for showing fluorescence on a flat computer screen.)

Xanthous

The name of the color xanthous is derived from xantho (meaning yellow or golden), from the Ancient Greek ξανθός and "ous" (meaning full of), from the Latin adjectival suffix -ōsus.

Carrot orange

Carrot orange is a tint of orange that is a representation of the color of the raw carrot vegetable.

The first recorded use of carrot orange as a color name in English was in 1684.

Orange peel

A discussion of the difference between the color orange (the color halfway between red and yellow, shown above as color wheel orange) and the color orange peel (the actual color of the outer skin of an orange), may be found in Maerz and Paul.
Orange peel is the color halfway between orange (color wheel) and amber on the color wheel.

The first recorded use of orange peel as a color name in English was in 1839.

Princeton orange

The first recorded use of Princeton orange as a color name in English was in 1928.

The color symbolizes Princeton University and is defined as Pantone 158. The equivalent RGB values vary among sources.

UT orange

This shade of orange is unique to the University of Tennessee (UT), defined by the institution as Pantone 151, and is called UT orange. It is offered for sale by The Home Depot and licensed by the university. According to the university, this shade of orange is derived from the American daisy, which grew in profusion on the oldest part of the campus, The Hill. The University of Tennessee colors are UT orange and white, and are used across its various sports teams, advertising, and merchandise.

Spanish orange

Spanish orange is the color that is called anaranjado (the Spanish word for the colour "orange") in the Guía de coloraciones (Guide to colorations) by Rosa Gallego and
Juan Carlos Sanz, a color dictionary published in 2005 that is widely popular in the Hispanophone realm.

Tangerine

The first recorded use of tangerine as a color name in English was in 1899.

Coral

The web color coral is a shade of orange.
The first recorded use of coral as a color name in English was in 1513.

Pumpkin

Pumpkin is a color that resembles pumpkins.

The first recorded use of pumpkin as a color name in English was in 1922.

Pumpkin or orange is used with black for Halloween decorations.

Tangelo

Tangelo is a shade of orange that is the color of the outer skin of the tangelo fruit.

Saffron

The first recorded use of saffron as a color name in English was in 1200. It is considered as the most important colour in Hinduism. It is worn by the monks of the Theravada tradition.

Goldenrod

The web color goldenrod is a representation of the color of some of the deeper gold colored goldenrod flowers.

The first recorded use of goldenrod as a color name in English was in 1915.

Hunyadi yellow

The web color Hunyadi yellow or Pear gold is represented on the Hunyadi coat of arms.

Giants orange

The color Giants orange  symbolizes, along with black and cream, the San Francisco Giants baseball team.

Persimmon

Persimmon is a color that resembles persimmons.

The first recorded use of persimmon as a color name in English was in 1922.

Butterscotch

Butterscotch is a color that resembles butterscotch.

Persian orange

Persian orange  is a color used in pottery and Persian carpets in Iran.

The first recorded use of Persian orange as a color name in English was in 1892.

Orange pudding (milk added to pureed oranges that is mixed in a blender with flour and slowly boiled on a stovetop) is colored Persian orange, assuming no food coloring is added. Allis-Chalmers tractors have been colored Persian orange since 1928 so that, even when caked with dirt, they could still be distinguished from landscape features.

Alloy orange

Alloy orange is one of the colors in the special set of metallic Crayola crayons called Metallic FX, the colors of which were formulated by Crayola in 2001.

Although this is supposed to be a metallic color, there is no mechanism for displaying metallic colors on a computer.

Burnt orange

Burnt orange has been used as a color name for this medium dark shade of orange since 1915.

This color is one variation that is used as a school color of The University of Texas at Austin, Auburn University, and Virginia Tech.

Burnt orange is not a standard color; for example, it is defined differently by Auburn University and the University of Texas at Austin. The National Hockey League's San Jose Sharks use burnt orange as a secondary color, and it is one of three colors of the National Football League's Cleveland Browns. The Chicago Bears also use it as an alternate color.

Burnt orange was used by the University of Montana prior to 1996 and Oklahoma State University for its football uniforms from 1973 through 1983.

Burnt orange was popular in interior design in the 1970s.

Burnt orange is also used to colour cylinders filled with the refrigerant R407C.

Tiger’s eye 

The color tiger’s eye is named for the tiger’s eye gemstone, so named because its banding resembles the eye of a tiger. This color was formulated by Crayola in 1994 as part of the Gem Tones set.

Brown

Brown, although an independent color term, actually combines the orange hue (or close to orange) with low brightness. It can be described as an especially dark orange or, in painters' terminology, a deep shade of orange.

The first recorded use of brown as a color name in English was in about 1000 AD in the Metres of Boethius.

Apricot Peach

Apricot Peach is a pale light grayish tangelo color.

See also
 Lists of colors

References